Tropic Thunder: Original Motion Picture Soundtrack was released on August 5, 2008, the week before the film was released in theaters.

Five songs, "Cum On Feel the Noize" by Quiet Riot, "Sympathy for the Devil" by The Rolling Stones, "For What It's Worth" by Buffalo Springfield, "Low" by Flo Rida and T-Pain, and "Get Back" by Ludacris, were not present on the soundtrack, yet did appear in the film. The soundtrack features songs from The Temptations, MC Hammer, Creedence Clearwater Revival, Edwin Starr, and other artists. The single "Name of the Game" by The Crystal Method featuring Ryu has an exclusive remix on the soundtrack.

The soundtrack debuted 20th on Billboard'''s Top Soundtracks list and peaked at 39th on its Top Independent Albums list. James Christopher Monger of allmusic compared the music to other film's soundtracks such as Platoon, Full Metal Jacket, and Forrest Gump'' and called it "...a fun but slight listen that plays out like an old late-'70s K-Tel compilation with a few bonus cuts from the future."

Track listing

References

External links
 
 Soundtracks for 'Tropic Thunder' at Internet Movie Database

2008 soundtrack albums
Film scores
Action film soundtracks
Comedy film soundtracks